On November 6, 2018, Washington, D.C., held an election for its mayor. Incumbent Democrat Muriel Bowser won re-election, becoming the first Mayor to do so for Washington, D.C., since Anthony A. Williams won a second term in 2002.

In the first 80 days of her re-election campaign, Bowser raised about $1.4 million for her campaign fund. She had no serious challengers in the primary, with only some little-known candidates filing to run against her. Bowser won the June 19 primary with 80% of the vote.

Democratic primary

Candidates

Declared
 Muriel Bowser, incumbent Mayor
 James Butler, Advisory Neighborhood Commissioner in Ward 5
 Ernest E. Johnson, real estate professional, unsuccessfully ran for mayor in 2010 and for D.C. Council in 2014

Declined
 Vincent C. Gray, Ward 7 D.C. Councillor and former Mayor
 Karl Racine, Attorney General of the District of Columbia

Primary results

Libertarian primary

Candidates

Declared
 Martin Moulton

Results

Green primary

Candidates

Declared
 Ann C. Wilcox,  Former Ward 2 DC Board of Education member from 1994 to 1998

Results

Independents

Candidates

Declared
 Dustin "DC" Canter

Results

References

2018
Washington
Mayoral
Washington, D.C.